If It Was Easy is a play written by Stewart F. Lane and Ward Morehouse III. The play is a greatly exaggerated version of a real life article on the front page of the New York Post involving Lane and Morehouse after the death of Frank Sinatra. The play ran off-broadway at The Douglas Fairbanks Theater in New York City. It was nominated for an American Theatre Critics Association’s Best New Play Award in 2000.

Synopsis
Legendary producer Steve Gallop, suddenly down on his luck, is seduced by the charms of a beautiful showbiz columnist, Randi Lester, who is betting she can improve Gallop’s Broadway track record with a musical based on the life of Frank Sinatra. The idea is to attract front page attention around the world; hundreds of Sinatra wannabes swamp Gallop’s offices. Investors plead for a piece of the action. Not among the pleading masses is mobster Joey Fingers, whose “family” knew Sinatra, and who naturally expects to bankroll the entire show. On the opening night, it looks like curtains for the whole cast until Joey gets an offer he can not refuse.

Productions
 The Douglas Fairbanks Theater ( NYC)
 7Stages Theater (Atlanta, GA)
 Berkshire Theatre Festival (MA)
 Actors Theatre of Nantucket (MA)
 Guild Hall (East Hampton, NY)

Off-Broadway opening night cast
John Jellison
Bonnie Comley
Vicki Van Tassel
William Marshall Miller
Brad Bellamy
Christian Kauffman
Martin LaPlatney
Gustave Johnson

References
The New York Observer article
Playbill
News from Playbill
Playbill article
Playbill article

External links
 See listing off-broadway
 Official website

Off-Broadway plays
Plays by Stewart F. Lane